The following are notable people associated (past or present) with the Assemblies of God.

References 

Assemblies of God-related lists
Assemblies